Richard Lew "Wimpy" Winther is a former center in the National Football League. He was drafted in the fourth round of the 1971 NFL Draft by the New Orleans Saints and played that season with the Green Bay Packers. The following season, he would play with the Saints.

Richard, nicknamed Wimpy, is married to Sandra Winther. He is the father of three children: Matthew (married to Tracey Winther and fathers Zach and Josh), Ashley, and Abby. After his professional football career ended, Wimpy spent a short period of time in banking. Afterwards, he began teaching and coaching at Shelby County High School in Shelby County, Alabama. Later on, he transferred to Rudd Middle School in Pinson, Alabama, where he taught health and education and coached various sports including football, wrestling, baseball and basketball. After 19 years at Rudd Middle School, Wimpy retired at the early age of 61.

References

People from Floyd County, Iowa
Green Bay Packers players
New Orleans Saints players
American football in Birmingham, Alabama
American football centers
Ole Miss Rebels football players
1947 births
Living people